Natacha Mohbat (born 1996) is a Lebanese alpine ski racer.

She competed at the 2015 World Championships in Beaver Creek, USA, in the slalom.

References

1996 births
Lebanese female alpine skiers
Living people
Alpine skiers at the 2018 Winter Olympics
Olympic alpine skiers of Lebanon